The following is a list of electro house artists.

A–D

A-Trak
Afrojack
Alesso
Erol Alkan
Steve Aoki
The Avener
Avicii
Danny Ávila
Benny Benassi
Bingo Players
Blasterjaxx
The Bloody Beetroots
Bodyrox
Booka Shade
Boys Noize
Breakbot
Busy P
Felix Cartal
CFCF
The Chainsmokers
Chuckie
Clockwork
Cold Blank
Congorock
The Count & Sinden
Crookers
Dada Life
Daft Punk
John Dahlbäck
deadmau5
Digitalism
Dimitri Vegas & Like Mike
Diplo
Dirty South
DJ Ajax
DJ Tocadisco
Duck Sauce

E–N

Fake Blood
Fedde le Grand
Feed Me
Felguk
Felix da Housecat
Dillon Francis
Joachim Garraud
Martin Garrix
Goldierocks
Green Velvet
David Guetta
Hard Rock Sofa
Hardwell
Calvin Harris
Icona Pop
Sebastian Ingrosso
Jack Beats
JDevil
Justice
Kavinsky
Kelis
Kill the Noise
Knife Party
Krewella
Laidback Luke
Le Castle Vania
Tommy Lee
Lo-Fi-Fnk
Lützenkirchen
Madeon
Major Lazer
Malente
Mason
Spoek Mathambo
Medicine 8
Kris Menace
Mr. Oizo
MSTRKRFT
NERVO
NuBreed

O–Z

Ummet Ozcan
Morgan Page
Ewan Pearson
Peking Duk
The Potbelleez
Eric Prydz
R3hab
Robbie Rivera
Porter Robinson
Sam La More
Sidney Samson
Sander van Doorn
SebastiAn
Shinichi Osawa
Shit Robot
Shout Out Out Out Out
Showtek
Simian Mobile Disco
Skrillex
Ivan Smagghe
Sneaky Sound System
Martin Solveig
Stephan Bodzin vs Marc Romboy
Surkin
Swedish House Mafia
Tiefschwarz
Tiësto
Tiga
TJH87
Tommy Trash
Totally Enormous Extinct Dinosaurs
Treasure Fingers
Tujamo
Uffie
Vandalism
David Vendetta
VINAI
Vitalic
Wolfgang Gartner
Yolanda Be Cool
Yuksek
Zedd
Zomboy

See also

Lists of musicians
List of house music artists
List of progressive house artists
List of club DJs

References

 
Electro house